John Deakin (born 4 March 1965) is a British coxswain. He won a gold medal at the 1994 World Rowing Championships in Indianapolis with the lightweight men's eight.

References

1965 births
Living people
British male rowers
World Rowing Championships medalists for Great Britain
Coxswains (rowing)
Rowers at the 1992 Summer Olympics
Olympic rowers of Great Britain